The 1995–96 Hellenic Football League season was the 43rd in the history of the Hellenic Football League, a football competition in England.

Premier Division

The Premier Division featured 14 clubs which competed in the division last season, along with four new clubs:
Burnham, relegated from the Southern Football League
Didcot Town, promoted from Division One
Endsleigh, promoted from Division One
Lambourn Sports, promoted from Division One

League table

Division One

Division One featured 16 clubs which competed in the division last season, along with two new clubs:
Harrow Hill, joined from the Gloucestershire County League
Pegasus Juniors, demoted from the Premier Division

League table

References

External links
 Hellenic Football League

1995-96
8